Leiostracus faerie is a species of tropical air-breathing land snails, a terrestrial pulmonate gastropod mollusc in the family Simpulopsidae. 

This species is endemic to Brazil.

References

Simpulopsidae
Endemic fauna of Brazil
Gastropods described in 2014